Gate of Mercy may refer to:

Gate of Mercy Synagogue
Golden Gate (Jerusalem)